Shirley Brown (born January 6, 1947, West Memphis, Arkansas) is an American R&B singer, best known for her million-selling single "Woman to Woman", which was nominated for a Grammy Award in 1975.

Biography
Brown was born in West Memphis, but was raised in Madison, Illinois, where she started singing in church at the age of nine. Early experience singing gospel gave her a powerful but expressive voice likened to that of Aretha Franklin. Albert King discovered her when she was aged 14, singing in the Harlem Club in Brooklyn, Illinois. Young Shirley went on the road with King for nine years. While King made sure she had a tutor, Brown often cut her classes to work with the band.

By 1972, Shirley was living in East St. Louis, Illinois, where she made her first record for the Abet label called, "I Ain't Gonna Tell" and "Love Built on a Strong Foundation". Bandleader Oliver Sain produced the record; Sain worked with King on his first hit record ten years earlier. By 1974, King recommended Brown to Stax Records in Memphis, Tennessee, where he had been one of the label's stars for some time.

Her 1974 hit, "Woman to Woman" spent two weeks at No. 1 in the Billboard R&B chart and climbed to #22 in the Billboard Hot 100. It sold over one million copies by December 1974, and was awarded a gold disc. It would be Stax's final major hit record (the song was later covered by Barbara Mandrell in 1978 and became a top-five country hit).

A moderately successful debut album, Woman to Woman, was released by Stax on their Truth label, but by 1975, the company was struggling financially and also facing litigation. A follow-up single, "It Ain't No Fun" was only a moderate success, and Stax closed soon afterwards.

Her signing to Arista Records in 1977 resulted in the album Shirley Brown, produced by the former Stax owner Jim Stewart and writer-producer Bettye Crutcher, who provided most of the songs. These included "Blessed Is the Woman" which reached No. 14 R&B (#102 pop).

Brown continued to record for several labels since then, including Fantasy, on the re-formed Stax label, and Sound Town. She has been with the Mississippi based blues label, Malaco Records since 1989. She remains a popular live performer, mainly in southern states of the US, without having found the recording success of her earlier years.

Discography

Albums

Singles

Grammy Award history
Grammy Award
1975 - Nominated for Best Rhythm & Blues Vocal Performance - Female

See also
List of 1970s one-hit wonders in the United States

References

External links
 
 
 Blues.about.com
Shirley Brown, Malaco Records
 The Shirley Brown story at Soul Express
 Soulwalking.co.uk

1947 births
Living people
20th-century American singers
20th-century African-American women singers
American rhythm and blues singers
People from West Memphis, Arkansas
People from East St. Louis, Illinois
Stax Records artists
Malaco Records artists
People from Madison, Illinois
Musicians from St. Louis
Singers from Missouri
20th-century American women singers
21st-century American women singers
21st-century American singers
21st-century African-American women singers